"Electric Love" is the debut single by American singer and songwriter Børns. The song was originally recorded by Børns for his second extended play, Candy, where it appears as the first track, and later appeared as the third track on his debut studio album, Dopamine. On February 26, 2017, the song was certified Platinum by the Recording Industry Association of America.

Release 
"Electric Love" was originally released on November 10, 2014, on Børns' second EP, Candy. The song was re-released as the third track of Børns' debut album, Dopamine.

On May 6, 2015, a music video for "Electric Love" was uploaded on Børns' Vevo channel on YouTube. The video features Børns singing the song and playing the guitar, as well as numerous female dancers and ecstatic colorful animations.

Reception 
"Electric Love" has been well received by both critics and audiences. NPR referred to the song as viral. The Guardians Kate Hutchinson praised the track's blend of glam rock and "high-intensity sound." Neil Z. Yeung of AllMusic dubbed the song a "Gary Glitter stomper" and the "alt-radio hit of summer 2015." Spins Brennan Carley described the song as a "crisp, beachside pop anthem."

Charts

Weekly charts

Year-end charts

Certifications

References 

2014 songs
Børns songs
2015 debut singles
Geffen Records singles
Interscope Records singles